The 2022 European Motocross Championship was the 34th European Motocross Championship season since it was revived in 1988. It included 16 events and 6 different classes. It started in Great Britain on 20 February and ended in Turkey on 4 September. All rounds acted as support classes at the European rounds of the 2022 MXGP.

EMX250
A 10-round calendar for the 2022 season was announced on 17 November 2021.
EMX250 is for riders competing on 2-stroke and 4-stroke motorcycles between 175cc-250cc.
Only riders under the age of 23 are allowed to compete.

Calendar

Entry list

Riders Championship

Manufacturers Championship

EMX125
A 9-round calendar for the 2022 season was announced on 17 November 2021.
EMX125 is for riders competing on 2-stroke motorcycles of 125cc.

Calendar

Entry list

Riders Championship

Manufacturers Championship

EMXOpen
A 7-round calendar for the 2022 season was announced on 17 November 2021.
EMX Open is for riders competing on 2-stroke and 4-stroke motorcycles up to 450cc.

Calendar

Entry list

Riders Championship

Manufacturers Championship

EMX2T
A 1-round calendar for the 2022 season was announced on 17 November 2021.
EMX2T is for riders competing on 2-stroke motorcycles of 250cc.

Calendar

Entry list

Riders Championship

Manufacturers Championship

EMX85
A 1-round calendar for the 2022 season was announced on 17 November 2021.
EMX85 is for riders competing on 2-stroke motorcycles of 85cc.

Calendar

Participants
Riders qualify for the championship by finishing in the top 10 in one of the 4 regional 85cc championships.

Riders Championship

EMX65
A 1-round calendar for the 2022 season was announced on 17 November 2021.
EMX65 is for riders competing on 2-stroke motorcycles of 65cc.

Calendar

Participants
Riders qualify for the championship by finishing in the top 10 in one of the 4 regional 65cc championships.

Riders Championship

References

External links
 

European Motocross
European Motocross Championship